Dachnaya is a rural locality (a village) in Sermenevsky Selsoviet, Beloretsky District, Bashkortostan, Russia. The population was 34 as of 2010. There is 1 street.

Geography 
Dachnaya is located 21 km southwest of Beloretsk (the district's administrative centre) by road. Sermenevo is the nearest rural locality.

References 

Rural localities in Beloretsky District